Diego Martín Valencia Morello (born 14 January 2000) is a Chilean professional footballer who plays as a forward for Salernitana and the Chile national football.

Club career

Universidad Catolica
Valencia debuted the year 2018 in the match against Deportes Iquique in San Carlos de Apoquindo, on the following date, gave assistance for the goal of the draw against Palestinian in La Cisterna. in the year 2018 he converted his first goals, in the triumph of Catolica against Coquimbo Unido, a match that was also his debut as a starter in the team.

Salernitana
On 11 July 2022, Valencia signed a four-year contract with Italian club Salernitana.

International career
Diego managed to make the winning goal of the Chile national U20 team, when the Odesur won.

In 2019, he was called to the national sub 20 team, after the injury of Nicolás Guerra.

At senior level, he was called up to the Chile national team  for the 2021 Copa América Quarter-finals to replace Guillermo Maripán due to an injury, making his international debut against Brazil.

Career statistics

Club

International

Honours
Universidad Católica
 Primera División de Chile: 2018, 2019, 2020, 2021
 Supercopa de Chile: 2019, 2020, 2021

Chile U20
 South American Games Gold medal: 2018

References

External links
 

2000 births
Living people
Chilean footballers
Sportspeople from Viña del Mar
Chile under-20 international footballers
Chile youth international footballers
Chile international footballers
Chilean expatriate footballers
Association football forwards
Club Deportivo Universidad Católica footballers
U.S. Salernitana 1919 players
Chilean Primera División players
Serie A players
South American Games gold medalists for Chile
South American Games medalists in football
Competitors at the 2018 South American Games
2021 Copa América players
Chilean expatriate sportspeople in Italy
Expatriate footballers in Italy
21st-century Chilean people